The Khitan people were a historical para-Mongolic nomadic people from Northeast Asia who, from the 4th century, inhabited an area corresponding to parts of modern Mongolia, Northeast China and the Russian Far East. As a people they descended from the proto-Mongols through the Xianbei.

The period of the Ancient Eight Tribes 
 Hechen (何辰) a Khitan chieftain (baghatur) (契丹莫弗贺) (ca.470)
 Mer-gan (Hanzi : 勿于 pinyin : Wuyu) another baghatur (ca. 479)
 Duomi Khagan (多彌可汗) (ca. 585)

The Dahe Tribal Confederation (618-730) (大賀氏)

Governor-general of Songmo (松漠都督)

Prefecture of Xuanzhou (玄州) 
Khitans tribes who did not belong to the Dahe confederation but living at the same period

Other Khitan chieftains (酋長) 

 Tanmozhe (貪沒折) (ca. 630)

The Yaonian Tribal Confederation (730-906) (遥辇氏)

The supreme chieftain of the Khitan (khagans)

Liao dynasty (916-1125) 

There were nine emperors of the Liao dynasty, which at its height ruled over an area composing modern day Mongolia and northern China for over two hundred years. The emperors of the Liao dynasty were Khitans from Yelü clan.

Qara Khitai/Western Liao (1124-1218)

Qutlugh-Khanid dynasty

Remarks 
The family name Li is a "rewarded" name being similar to the Emperor's name Li of the Tang dynasty.

See also 

 Khitan people
 History of the Khitans

References

External links

Khitan
Lists of Chinese monarchs
Khitan history